The Berliner Rundfunk (BERU) was a radio station set in East Germany. It had a political focus and discussed events in East Berlin. Today it is a commercial radio station broadcast with the name "Berliner Rundfunk 91.4".

History 
The Berliner Rundfunk was established in 1945 by the Soviet Military Administration in Germany. It initially broadcast from the Haus des Rundfunks building of the former Reichs-Rundfunk-Gesellschaft (Reich-Radio Association) GmbH on Masurenallee in Berlin-Charlottenburg. It is notable that this broadcaster was located in the British sector of what was to become West Berlin. The station was merged with the regional broadcasters in Potsdam and Schwerin as well as the broadcast studio in Rostock.

In the course of the centralization of the German Democratic Republic (GDR) in 1952, in which among other things five Länder were eliminated, the status of East German radio changed. In the meantime, the new radio headquarters of the Rundfunk der DDR was established on Nalepastraße in Oberschöneweide, East Berlin. After 1952, all radio programs in the GDR emanated from there. The Berliner Rundfunk was changed to the program Berlin I with a political focus and allotted the transmitters in Schwerin and Weimar. The program also took over the shortwave transmission of the previous Deutschlandsender.

In August 1953 the radio system was reorganized. This reform created the Deutschlandsender, the Berliner Rundfunk, and the Radio DDR. From June 1954 until September 1955 the program of the Berliner Rundfunk was temporarily called "Berlin 1. Programm" in contrast to the program of Radio DDR which was called "Berlin 2. Programm."

The Berliner Rundfunk transmitted its program set over mediumwave (657, 693, 999, 1170, 1431 and 1575 kHz) and VHF.

In connection with the unification of the two German states, the Berliner Rundfunk ceased its transmission in February 1990.  In Berlin an identically named private radio program broadcast on the VHF frequency 91.4 MHz. The other open frequencies of the Berliner Rundfunk were taken over by regional programs of the newly created Länder.

See also
Broadcasting in East Germany
Eastern Bloc information dissemination

References
 Petra Galle: RIAS Berlin und Berliner Rundfunk 1945-1949. Münster [u.a.]: Lit Verlag, 2003. 

Eastern Bloc mass media
Radio in Germany
Defunct radio stations in East Germany
Mass media in Berlin
Radio stations established in 1945
Radio stations disestablished in 1991
1945 establishments in Germany
1991 disestablishments in Germany